Yazidism in Iraq refers to adherents of Yazidism from Iraq who reside mainly in the districts of Shekhan, Simele, Zakho and Tel Kaif, in Bashiqa and Bahzani, and the areas around Sinjar mountains in Sinjar district. According to estimates, the number of Yazidis in Iraq is up to 700,000. According to the Yazda aid organization, just over half a million Yazidis lived throughout Iraq before August 2014.

Settlement areas

The settlement area of the Yazidis in Iraq includes the districts of Sinjar, Tel Kaif, al-Hamdaniya and Shekhan of the Nineveh Governorate in north-western Iraq. Other Yazidi settlement areas are in the Simele district and in the Zakho district in the Duhok governorate.

History

As a result of World War I and the fall of the Ottoman Empire, the territories which Yazidis lived in were divided into four nation-states which were founded on the remnants of the Ottoman Empire. In 1921, the victorious Allies established the state of Iraq under British Mandate, its borders heavily influenced by Britain in line with the European nations' interests and ambitions. Faisal ibn Hussein was chosen by Britain as the first king of Iraq. 

Yazidis refused to submit to King Faisal and any other Arabic state rule. They presented several reports and petitions to the British colonel in Mosul requesting that no Muslims are to be given the administrative posts in their districts and reaffirming they wanted a direct rule under Britain. John Guest reports that in the aftermath of World War I, minorities in Mosul province were invited to express their views about their destiny, about the Yazidis, the following was written:

This stance by the Yazidis had to do with King Faisal's Muslim family background, reigniting fears of persecution at the hands of Muslims that they had faced during Ottoman rule, consequently, they preferred to live under Britain, a Christian state. In 1925, the League of Nations set up an international committee and sent it to the areas within Mosul Mandate for the purpose of resolving the Mosul issue and organising a referendum in order to poll the population of Mosul to determine whether they wanted to join Turkey or Iraq. Yazidis refused Turkish rule, and according to the results of the 1925 referendum, Yazidis in Mosul Mandate voted to join Iraq provided they would be under direct protection of the British or European Mandate.

The first Iraqi campaign against the Yazidis after the founding of the state took place in 1925 when the government of Iraq wanted to carry out the "Al-Jazeera" project, which aimed to evacuate Yazidi villages and confiscate their agricultural lands to later give them out to members of the large groups of Arab tribes, the Shammar. Their Yazidi inhabitants would then be relocated to collective towns built for them. This plan was met with stern opposition against the Iraqi government from the Yazidis, in particular from one of their tribal leaders in Sinjar, Dawud al-Dawud.

The non-Muslim minorities, especially the Yazidis, were largely prohibited from participating in state institutions, even though the Yazidis were regarded by the League of Nations as a minority like the Jews and Christians, which ensured their rights in Iraq. But in 1925, the Jews and Christians had representatives in the Constituent Assembly (Iraqi Parliament), as provided by the quotas given to them by the Iraqi government based on their population numbers. On the other hand, the population statistics regarding Yazidi numbers in Iraq were at the time inconsistent. Between 1920-1947, population estimates of Yazidis ranged from 26,000-30,000, despite this, there was no Yazidi representation in the Iraqi parliament from the founding of Iraqi Monarchy until 1947. But the government cabinets during the last decade of the monarchy, which lasted until 1958, usually had a Yazidi representative from Sinjar region.

On August 14, 2007, the Yazidis in Iraq were victims of the 2007 Yazidi communities bombings in Sinjar, which killed 796 people.

On August 3, 2014, the Islamic State committed genocide against Yazidis in the Sinjar region of northern Iraq, killing an estimated 5,000 to 10,000 Yazidis and abducting another 6,000 to 7,000 Yazidis women and children.

Flight and migration
Due to persecution, many Yazidis fled Iraq, including over 75,000 to Germany since 2015.

Notable people
 Nadia Murad (Yazidi human rights activist and Nobel Peace Prize winner)
 Mahmoud Ezidi (Yazidi Peshmerga fighter)
 Pîr Xidir Silêman (writer, teacher and parliamentarian)
 Sheikh Ali Ilyas (current Baba Sheikh)
 Hazim Tahsin Beg (current Mir/Prince of Yazidis)
 Khurto Hajji Ismail (previous Baba Sheikh)
 Tahseen Said (previous Mir/Prince of Yazidis)
 Hemoyê Shero (nineteenth century Yezidi tribal chief)
 Haydar Shesho (founder and commander of the Êzîdxan Protection Force)
 Ezidi Mîrza (17th century governor of Mosul, Yezidi leader and hero)
 Meyan Khatun (Yazidi princess)
 Vian Dakhil (Politician)
 Mahma Xelil (Politician)

See also

 Yazidism in Turkey
 Yazidis in Syria

References

 
Iraq
Ethnic groups in Iraq
Religion in Iraq
Middle Eastern diaspora in Iraq